The 2nd constituency of the Tarn (French: Deuxième circonscription du Tarn) is a French legislative constituency in the Tarn département. Like the other 576 French constituencies, it elects one MP using the two-round system, with a run-off if no candidate receives over 50% of the vote in the first round.

Description

The 2nd constituency of Tarn lies in the north west of the constituency and includes some of Albi, which it shares with Tarn's 1st constituency.

Until 2017 the constituency historically elected PS deputies, with the sole exception of 1993. At the 2017 election the previously dominant PS came a distant 4th in the first round behind En Marche!, the National Front and La France Insoumise.

Assembly Members

Election results

2022

 
 
 
 
 
 
 
 
|-
| colspan="8" bgcolor="#E9E9E9"|
|-

2017

 
 
 
 
 
 
 
 
|-
| colspan="8" bgcolor="#E9E9E9"|
|-

2012

 
 
 
 
 
 
|-
| colspan="8" bgcolor="#E9E9E9"|
|-

2007

 
 
 
 
 
 
 
|-
| colspan="8" bgcolor="#E9E9E9"|
|-

2002

 
 
 
 
 
 
 
|-
| colspan="8" bgcolor="#E9E9E9"|
|-

1997

 
 
 
 
 
 
|-
| colspan="8" bgcolor="#E9E9E9"|
|-

References

2